In cryptographic protocols, a key encapsulation mechanism (KEM) is used to secure symmetric key material for transmission using asymmetric (public-key) algorithms. It is commonly used in hybrid cryptosystems. In practice, public key systems are clumsy to use in transmitting long messages. Instead they are often used to exchange symmetric keys, which are relatively short. The symmetric key is then used to encrypt the longer message.
The traditional approach to sending a symmetric key with public key systems is to first generate a random symmetric key and then encrypt it using the chosen public key algorithm. The recipient then decrypts the public key message to recover the symmetric key. As the symmetric key is generally short, padding is required for full security and proofs of security for padding schemes are often less than complete.  KEMs simplify the process by generating a random element in the finite group underlying the public key system and deriving the symmetric key by hashing that element, eliminating the need for padding.

Example using RSA encryption

Using the same notation employed in the RSA system article, say Alice has transmitted her public key  to Bob, while keeping her private key secret, as usual. Bob then wishes to send symmetric key M to Alice. M might be a 128 or 256-bit AES key, for example. Note that the public key  is typically 2048-bits or even longer, thus much larger than typical symmetric keys. If  is small enough that , then the encryption can be quickly broken using ordinary integer arithmetic.

To avoid such potential weakness, Bob first turns M into a larger integer  by using an agreed-upon reversible protocol known as a padding scheme, such as OAEP. He then computes the ciphertext  corresponding to:

 

 

Given , she recovers the original message M by reversing the padding scheme.

With KEM the process is simplified as follows:

He then computes the ciphertext  corresponding to :

 

 

The KEM eliminates  the complexity of the padding scheme and the proofs needed to show the padding is secure. An attacker who somehow recovers M cannot get the plaintext . With the padding approach, he can. Thus KEM is said to encapsulate the key. 

Thus, if key encapsulations for several recipients need to be computed, independent values  should be used.

Similar techniques are available for Diffie-Hellman key exchange and other public key methods.

References

See also

 Key Wrap
 Optimal Asymmetric Encryption Padding
 Hybrid Cryptosystem

Public-key encryption schemes
Key management